Garstin is a surname, and may refer to:

 Alethea Garstin (1894–1978), Cornish artist and illustrator
 Crosbie Garstin (1887–1930), poet, son of Norman Garstin
 John Henry Garstin (1838–1903), British administrator in India
 Norman Garstin (1847–1926), Irish artist, teacher, art critic, and journalist